Rybnovsky District is an administrative and municipal district (raion), one of the twenty-five in Ryazan Oblast, Russia. It is located in the northwest of the oblast. Its administrative center is the town of Rybnoye. Population: 35,585 (2010 Census);  The population of Rybnoye accounts for 51.7% of the district's total population.

References

Notes

Sources

Districts of Ryazan Oblast